Sir Douglas John White  (born 5 September 1945) is a former New Zealand jurist.

White was born in Wellington in 1945. The jurist Sir John White (1911–2007) was his father, and Charles White, a lawyer and briefly a member of the Legislative Council, was his grandfather. He was appointed Queen's Counsel in 1988, and sat as a judge of the High Court from 2009 until 2012, when he was appointed to the bench of the Court of Appeal. He retired in 2015.

In the 2018 New Year Honours, White was appointed a Knight Companion of the New Zealand Order of Merit, for services to the judiciary.

References

1945 births
Living people
20th-century New Zealand lawyers
New Zealand King's Counsel
High Court of New Zealand judges
Court of Appeal of New Zealand judges
Knights Companion of the New Zealand Order of Merit
21st-century New Zealand judges